The Stephen F. Austin Ladyjacks basketball team is the women's basketball team that represents Stephen F. Austin State University (SFA) in Nacogdoches, Texas. SFA joined the Western Athletic Conference on July 1, 2021 after playing the previous 34 seasons in the Southland Conference.

The women's basketball team was part of the growth in popularity of women's intercollegiate basketball in the 1970s.  Women's basketball at the college level was organized under the auspices of the AIAW in the early 1970s, at a time when competitive power was distributed among smaller colleges, such as Immaculata, Delta State, West Chester State and Wayland Baptist. The Ladyjacks were a consistent presence in the Top 20 rankings during the 1970s.

Current roster

Postseason appearances

NCAA tournament
The Ladyjacks have appeared in 18 NCAA tournaments. Their combined record is 10–18.

WNIT
The Ladyjacks have appeared in four Women's National Invitation Tournaments (WNIT). Their combined record is 0–4.

WBI
The Ladyjacks have appeared in two Women's Basketball Invitationals (WBI). Their combined record is 0–2.

AIAW Division I
The Ladyjacks made six appearances in the AIAW National Division I basketball tournament, with a combined record of 6–8.

References

External links